Acanthocalycium thionanthum subsp. glaucum  is a subspecies of Acanthocalycium from Argentina.

References

External links
 
 

thionanthum subsp. glaucum
Flora of Argentina